Union Station is a Washington Metro station in Washington, D.C. on the Red Line. It has a single underground island platform.

The station is located in the Northeast quadrant of the city under the western end of Union Station, the main train station for Washington, where connections can be made to Amtrak intercity trains, as well as Virginia Railway Express and MARC commuter rail trains to suburbs in Virginia, Maryland, and West Virginia.

The station was originally named "Union Station–Visitor Center" but when the National Visitor Center there failed, it was renamed Union Station. One or two pylons still read "Union Station-Visitor Center", and a number of older stations still display this name on signage.

Service began on March 27, 1976 with the opening of the Red Line. It is the busiest station in the Metrorail system, averaging 29,197 passengers per weekday as of May 2017.

History
After groundbreaking in 1969, the station opened as Union Station-Visitor Center (National Visitor Center) on March 27, 1976 with the rest of the Red Line.

Union Station had dirtier walls than most stations as trains brought in soot from diesel engines in Union Station, resulting in a dimmer station. In March 2017, it was announced the station would be painted white at a cost of $75,000–$100,000. This sparked a debate amongst riders, as preservationists did not like the irrevocable act of painting the brutalist cavern, while other riders liked the brightened stations and cleaner feels that resulted from the white paint.

Between January 15 to January 21, 2021, this station was closed because of security concerns due to the 2020 Inauguration.

Future improvements
The street-level entrance on First street, built into the existing retaining wall, will be rebuilt to ADA-compliant standards, adding more space for extra fare gates and connections between the platform and track level.

Station layout
Like the other original stations of the Metro, Union Station sports coffered vaults of concrete in its ceiling. One end of the station has a lowered "box" cut out of the ceiling. The station features an island platform with two exits, one mid-platform mezzanine leading to the main hall of Union Station and Massachusetts Avenue and the one northern exit leading to 1st Street NE and to the main boarding concourse.

Notable places nearby

 C-SPAN
 Capitol Hill
 Capitol Police Headquarters
 CNN Washington Bureau
 Columbus Circle
 Dirksen Senate Office Building
 Federal Energy Regulatory Commission
 Folger Shakespeare Library
 Georgetown University Law Center
 Gonzaga College High School
 Government Printing Office
 Hart Senate Office Building
 Heritage Foundation
 Hillsdale College's Allan P. Kirby, Jr. Center for Constitutional Studies and Citizenship
 Japanese-American Memorial
 National Guard Memorial Museum
 National Postal Museum
 Russell Senate Office Building
 Securities and Exchange Commission
 Stanton Park
 Supreme Court of the United States
 Sursum Corda Cooperative
 Thurgood Marshall Federal Judiciary Building
 Union Station
 United States Capitol
 Washington, D.C. bus terminal

Gallery

References

External links

 1st Street entrance from Google Maps Street View

Stations on the Red Line (Washington Metro)
Washington Metro stations in Washington, D.C.
Railway stations in the United States opened in 1976
1976 establishments in Washington, D.C.
Capitol Hill
Railway stations located underground in Washington, D.C.
Near Northeast (Washington, D.C.)